Gol Zard (also Romanized as Gol-e Zard; also known as Golzard-e Bālā) is a village in Beyranvand-e Shomali Rural District, Bayravand District, Khorramabad County, Lorestan Province, Iran. At the 2006 census, its population was 105, in 17 families.

References 

Towns and villages in Khorramabad County